Rustad may refer to:

Clare Rustad (born 1983), professional football player, who plays for Toronto Lady Lynx
Fritz Rustad (1852–1930), Norwegian civil and royal servant
John Rustad, BC Liberal Member of the Legislative Assembly of the Canadian province of British Columbia
Michael Rustad, law professor at Suffolk University Law School, an author and television commentator
Tine Rustad Kristiansen (born 1980), Norwegian handball player
Tommy Rustad (born 1968), Norwegian auto racing driver

See also
Rustad, Minnesota
Rustad Bay, small bay indenting the southwest side of Annenkov Island, off the south coast of South Georgia
Rustad Knoll, rounded, snow-topped elevation (365 m) which surmounts the south shore of Bouvetøya immediately east of Cato Point